Accokeek Creek is a tidal tributary of Potomac Creek, itself a tributary of the Potomac River, in Stafford County, Virginia, United States.

Nomenclature
The United States Board on Geographic Names officially decided upon the creek's name in 1940. Before the official naming decision, Accokeek Creek was also alternatively known as Accakeek Creek.

Course
Accokeek Creek rises on the Aquia Creek divide about 0.25 miles northeast of Moores Corner, Virginia.  Accokeek Creek then flows southeast to meet Potomac Creek at Crows Nest Point just upstream of the Potomac River.

Watershed
Accokeek Creek drains  of area, receives about 43.0 in/year of precipitation, has a topographic wetness index of 390.53 and is about 60.1% forested.

Maps

See also
Accokeek (plantation), homestead of George Mason I
List of rivers of Virginia

References

External links
Old U.S. 1 Bridge Across Accokeek Creek, Stafford, VA
Accokeek Iron Furnace Marker

Rivers of Stafford County, Virginia
Rivers of Virginia
Tributaries of the Potomac River
Ironworks in Virginia